Billinge Chapel End is a civil parish in St Helens, Merseyside, England.  It contains 13 buildings that are recorded in the National Heritage List for England as designated listed buildings.   Of these, two are listed at  Grade II*, the middle of the three grades, and the others are at Grade II, the lowest grade.  The parish contains the village of Billinge and surrounding countryside.  The listed buildings consist of houses, farmhouses, farm buildings, and two churches with associated structures.

Key

Buildings

References

Citations

Sources

Listed buildings in Merseyside
Lists of listed buildings in Merseyside
Buildings and structures in the Metropolitan Borough of St Helens